Roderick Mendenilla Paulate (born April 4, 1960) is a Filipino former actor, TV host, comedian and politician. Paulate had previously hosted TV shows like Vilma On 7, Tonight With Dick & Carmi, Magandang Tanghali Bayan, and The Singing Bee. Paulate is also a comedian in shows Abangan Ang Susunod Na Kabanata, Oki Doki Doc, Mana Mana, Ang Tanging Ina: The Comedy Series, and Tweets For My Sweets. Paulate is also a dramatic actor in previous shows, Malayo Pa Ang Umaga, Makita Ka Lang Muli, Rosalinda, Munting Heredera and his current action drama series, the long running FPJ's Ang Probinsyano, which he plays a straight mayor-politician.

Biography

Child actor
Paulate started his career as a child actor. He received his first Best Child Actor award from the Manila Film Festival for the movie Kasalanan Kaya in 1968. His first FAMAS award was for Anghel na Walang Langit in 1970.

Gay roles
Roderick's first foray in gay roles was in 1979 when he appeared in Maryo J. De Los Reyes' High School Circa ’65. He became Roda Coburns in the early evening sitcom, "Tepok Bunot" over BBC-Channel 2 with Bibeth Orteza, Isabel Rivas and Tony Mabesa.  A producer then gave him the lead role in Charot, a movie inspired by Dustin Hoffman's gender-bending performance in Tootsie. His movie Inday Inday sa Balitaw was a huge success, that in 1987 he made four gay movies in a span of eight months: Jack en Poy, Bb. Tsuperman, Kumander Gringa, and 1+1=12+1. Paulate continued to play gay roles in movies and television. Paulate' influenced Vice Ganda, Allan K., and Paolo Ballesteros.

Non-gay roles
Paulate soon after tackled non-gay roles on both movies and television, displaying his versatility.  His first known non-gay role during his peak years as a comedian was Last Two Minutes which he played a vertically challenged basketball coach with PBA Legends Alvin Patrimonio, Jerry Codiñera & Paul "Bong" Alvarez, and Regal teen stars Zoren Legaspi, Jeffrey Santos, Aljon Jimenez, Carmina Villarroel, Ruffa Gutierrez & Aiko Melendez. He also played the role of Ding, a mentally-challenged homeless mute in 1980 in the first Philippine TV series Malayo Pa Ang Umaga, about village life in the Philippines in the second world war under Japanese Imperial Army occupation.  Paulate's 1st fantasy drama role was Engkanto, released in 1992 with the late hip hop king Francis Magalona.  He played a straight tree man who saves the environment from nasty illegal loggers.

Singer and performer
Dubbed as the Rick Astley Of The Philippines, Paulate also ventured into singing where he was influenced by his singing idol Rick Astley.  He was in-demand as a performer/host in various defunct variety shows, notably Tonight With Dick & Carmi, Vilma & Magandang Tanghali Bayan.

Awards
All in all, Paulate has received six Best Child Actor awards and 17 awards during his adult years starting with Inday, Inday sa Balitaw in 1986 (co-starring Maricel Soriano) when he received the Best Supporting Actor trophy. In 1996, Paulate was named Best Actor in Drama at the Asian Television Awards, and then in 2000, for his role in the Maalaala Mo Kaya episode "Wristwatch" and again in 1981, for his very difficult role in Malayo Pa Ang Umaga, the very first successful TV series in the Philippines.

Paulate is also inducted to the Philippines Eastwood City Walk Of Fame in 2012 for contributing his acting, singing, hosting and also being a comedian.

Political career
Paulate was elected as councilor for Quezon City's 2nd district in 2010. Paulate was removed from office by the Office of the Ombudsman as councilor of Quezon City because of hiring ghost employees. He was barred from running for any public office.

Despite barring him from running for public office, Paulate ran for his third term as a councilor and was eventually elected.

On December 12, 2016, however, the Court of Appeals overturned the ruling of the Office of the Ombudsman's dismissing Paulate together with 3 other officials of the Quezon City local government from the public service.

Paulate unsuccessfully ran for vice mayor in 2019, as the running mate of former 2nd district representative Chuck Mathay. He also sought a return to the city council in 2022 for the 2nd district under the Malayang QC ticket of Mike Defensor, but was also unsuccessful.

On December 2, 2022, the Sandiganbayan convicted him of one count of graft and nine counts of falsification of public documents in connection with his hiring of ghost employees. He faces between 10 1⁄2 to 62 years in prison, a total fine of ₱90,000, and is permanently barred from holding public office. Paulate and his accomplice, his driver and liaison officer Vicente Bajamunde, were also ordered to compensate the government with the amount of public funds they embezzled, amounting to ₱1.109 million with 6% interest per annum until full payment.

Personal life
Paulate is single. He has previously dated Jackie Aquino, a daughter of former Senator Butz Aquino.

He completed his secondary education in 1984 at Jose Rizal College (now José Rizal University).

Filmography

Television

Films
 Kung Fu Divas (2013)
 D' Kilabots Pogi Brothers Weh?! (2012)
 Zombadings 1: Patayin sa Shokot si Remington (2011)
 Ded na si Lolo (2009)
 Can This Be Love (2005)
 Pa Siyam (2004)
 Pera o Bayong (Not da TV!) (2000)
 Bala at Lipistik (1994)
 Engkanto (1994)
 Buddy en Sol: Sine Ito! (1992)
 Last Two Minutes (1989)
 Petrang Kabayo 2 (1989)
 Ako Si Kiko, Ako Si Kikay (1988)
 Petrang Kabayo at ang Pilyang Kuting (1988)
 Binibining Tsuperman (1987)
 Jack en Poy (1987)
 Bb. Tsuperman (1987)
 Kumander Gringa (1987)
 1+1=12+1 (1987)
 Mga Anak ni Facifica Falayfay (1987)
 Inday Bote (1985)
 Aguila (1980)
 Alkitrang Dugo (1975)
 Mga Anghel na Walang Langit (1970)
 Ito Ang Lalake (1964)

Awards

References

External links
 

1962 births
Living people
Filipino male child actors
Filipino male comedians
Male actors from Metro Manila
Quezon City Council members
Bicolano people
Bicolano politicians
Bicolano actors
Filipino politicians convicted of crimes
Filipino politicians convicted of corruption
GMA Network personalities
ABS-CBN personalities
Filipino actor-politicians
José Rizal University alumni
Filipino male film actors
Filipino male television actors
Nationalist People's Coalition politicians